Stefan Hermann (born 13 December 1959) is a former professional tennis player from Germany.

Biography

Tennis career
Hermann was a semi-finalist at the Neu-Ulm Challenger tournament in 1983, with wins over José López-Maeso, Ulrich Pinner and Balázs Taróczy. He made one main draw appearance on the Grand Prix circuit, at the Suisse Open Gstaad in 1984. In the first round he beat world number 30 and sixth seed Mel Purcell, then lost in second round to Brian Teacher.

It was in doubles that Hermann played most of his tennis and he won two Challenger titles, both in 1984, at Bielefeld and Neu-Ulm. In 1985 he partnered with Tore Meinecke and made the semi-finals of a Grand Prix event in Nice, as well as making the main draw at the French Open and Wimbledon Championships.

Personal life
Now based in Santa Barbara, California, Hermann is a self described social entrepreneur who is involved in youth mentoring. It was in that capacity he appeared on an episode of Oprah's Lifeclass in 2013.

With wife Siddhi he is a parent to seven children.

Challenger titles

Doubles: (2)

References

External links
 
 

1959 births
Living people
West German male tennis players
Sportspeople from Münster
German expatriates in the United States
Tennis people from North Rhine-Westphalia